Greatest Hits is the greatest hits album by American country music artist Rodney Atkins. It was released on February 3, 2015 by Curb Records. The album features twelve songs, including Atkins' six number one hits. It also includes one new song, "Eat Sleep Love You Repeat", which was released as a single.

Track listing

Chart performance

The album debuted on the Top Country Albums chart at No. 28, with 1,800 copies sold.

Album

Singles

References

2015 greatest hits albums
Rodney Atkins albums
Curb Records compilation albums